Nuclear peace is a theory of international relations which argues that the presence of nuclear weapons may in some circumstances decrease the risk of crisis escalation, since parties will seek to avoid situations that could lead to the use of nuclear weapons. Proponents of nuclear peace theory therefore believe that controlled nuclear proliferation may be beneficial for global stability. Critics argue that nuclear proliferation increases the chance of nuclear war through either deliberate or in-deliberate use of nuclear weapons, as well as the likelihood of nuclear material falling into the hands of violent non-state actors.

The major debate on the issue has been between Kenneth Waltz, the founder of neorealist theory in international relations, and Scott Sagan, a leading proponent of organizational theories in international politics. Waltz generally argues that "more may be better" and contends that new nuclear states will use their acquired nuclear capabilities as nuclear deterrence and thus preserve peace. Sagan argues that "more will be worse" since new nuclear states often lack adequate organizational controls over their new weapons, which makes for a high risk of deliberate or accidental nuclear war or of theft of nuclear material by terrorists to perpetrate nuclear terrorism.

Argument 
A nuclear peace results if the costs of war are unacceptably high for both sides. In a two-sided conflict in which both sides have a second-strike capability, defense becomes impossible and so it is the very prospect of fighting the war, rather than the possibility of losing it, that induces restraint.

In a condition of mutually assured destruction, there are civilian "hostages" on both sides, which facilitates cooperation by acting as an informal mechanism of contract enforcement between states. There are economic equivalents of such informal mechanisms used to effect credible commitment; for example, corporations use "hostages" in the form of initial setup costs that act as collateral to deter subsidiaries and franchisees from cheating.

Nuclear weapons may also lessen a state's reliance on allies for security, thus preventing allies from dragging each other into wars; known as chain ganging, it is frequently said to be one of the major causes of World War I.

Since the death of civilians is an essential part of mutually assured destruction, a normative consequence of nuclear weapons is that war loses its historical function as a symbol of glory and measure of national strength.

As a method of preventing a destabilizing arms race, the concept of minimal deterrence represents one way of solving the security dilemma and avoiding an arms race.

A study published in the Journal of Conflict Resolution in 2009 quantitatively evaluated the nuclear peace hypothesis and found support for the existence of the stability-instability paradox. The study determined that nuclear weapons promote strategic stability and prevent largescale wars but simultaneously allow for more low intensity conflicts. If a nuclear monopoly exists between two states, and one state has nuclear weapons and its opponent does not, there is a greater chance of war. In contrast, if there is mutual nuclear weapon ownership with both states possessing nuclear weapons, the odds of war drop precipitously.

Criticisms 
Critics argue that war can occur even under conditions of mutually assured destruction.

Actors are not always rational, as bureaucratic procedure and internal intrigue may cause subrational outcomes. Related to and reinforcing that point is that there is always an element of uncertainty. One cannot always control emotions, subordinates, and equipment, especially when one has limited information and is faced with high stakes and fast timetables. There are unintended consequences, unwanted escalation, irrationality, misperception, and the security dilemma.

Another reason is that deterrence has an inherent instability. As Kenneth Boulding said: "If deterrence were really stable... it would cease to deter." If decision-makers were perfectly rational, they would never order the largescale use of nuclear weapons, and the credibility of the nuclear threat would be low.

However, that apparent perfect rationality criticism is countered and so is consistent with current deterrence policy. In Essentials of Post-Cold War Deterrence, the authors detail an explicit advocation of ambiguity regarding "what is permitted" for other nations and its endorsement of "irrationality" or, more precisely, the perception thereof as an important tool in deterrence and foreign policy. The document claims that the capacity of the United States, in exercising deterrence, would be hurt by portraying US leaders as fully rational and cool-headed: 

Some commentators critical of the concept of nuclear peace further make the argument that nonstate actors and rogue states could supply nuclear weapons to terrorist organizations and so undermine conventional deterrence and therefore nuclear peace, especially with the existence of international terrorist networks seeking access to nuclear sources.

However Robert Gallucci, the president of the John D. and Catherine T. MacArthur Foundation, argues that although traditional deterrence is not an effective approach toward terrorist groups bent on causing a nuclear catastrophe, "the United States should instead consider a policy of expanded deterrence, which focuses not solely on the would-be nuclear terrorists but on those states that may deliberately transfer or inadvertently lead nuclear weapons and materials to them. By threatening retaliation against those states, the United States may be able to deter that which it cannot physically prevent."

Graham Allison makes a similar case and argues that the key to expanded deterrence is coming up with ways of tracing nuclear material to the country that forged the fissile material: "After a nuclear bomb detonates, nuclear forensic cops would collect debris samples and send them to a laboratory for radiological analysis. By identifying unique attributes of the fissile material, including its impurities and contaminants, one could trace the path back to its origin." The process is analogous to identifying a criminal by fingerprints: "The goal would be twofold: first, to deter leaders of nuclear states from selling weapons to terrorists by holding them accountable for any use of their own weapons; second, to give leaders every incentive to tightly secure their nuclear weapons and materials."

See also 
 Balance of terror
 Deterrence theory
 Long Peace
 Minimum deterrence
 Minimum Credible Deterrence
 Mutual assured destruction
 Nuclear weapons debate
 Peace through strength
 Pax Atomica

References 

International relations theory
Nuclear strategy
Nuclear warfare
International security
Peace
Economic growth